Edmund of Sweden - Swedish: Emund - may refer to:

Emund Eriksson, Swedish prince or king 10th century
Emund the Old, Swedish king c. 1050-1060
Emund Eriksson the Younger, Swedish prince 10th century, son of King Eric the Victorious
Anund Jacob of Sweden, in some sources nicknamed Emund
Prince Gustaf Adolf, Duke of Västerbotten, who was called only Edmund in private